Keshik (also Romanized as Keshīk) is a village in Moezziyeh Rural District, Chatrud District, Kerman County, Kerman Province, Iran. At the 2006 census, its population was 11, in 4 families.

References 

Populated places in Kerman County